John Calvin Batchelor (born April 29, 1948) is an American author and host of Eye on the World on the CBS Audio Network. His flagship station is New York's 710 WOR. The show is a hard-news-analysis radio program on current events, world history, global politics and natural sciences. It has travelled widely to report, from the Middle East to the South Caucasus to the Arabian Peninsula and East Asia

For five years, from early 2001 to September 2006, based at AM 770 WABC radio in New York, his radio program The John Batchelor Show was syndicated nationally on the ABC radio network.  On October 7, 2007, Batchelor returned to radio on WABC, and later to other large market stations on a weekly basis. As of November 30, 2009, Batchelor was once again hosting a nightly show on WABC, from 9 p.m. to 1a.m. Eastern Time and heard in many major markets across the country through what eventually became the Westwood One network.

The program for a time was heard seven nights a week, using prerecorded material on weekends.  Later, it aired Monday through Friday on WABC and many Westwood One network affiliates.  Batchelor describes the show as a "news magazine" since he does not take phone calls from listeners but does a series of interviews with guests and reporters. The show's run on Westwood One ended in March 2021 as part of a reorganization at WABC, after which Batchelor almost immediately began his current show with CBS.

Early years
Batchelor was born in Bryn Mawr, Pennsylvania to an Assyrian mother from Iran and a Midwestern American father.  He was raised primarily in Lower Merion Township of Montgomery County, in Pennsylvania's 13th congressional district.  His mother and father both served in the United States Army during World War II; his father also served in the Korean War.  Batchelor is the eldest of five brothers. He is a 1970 graduate of Princeton University, briefly studied at the University of Edinburgh, and a graduate of Union Theological Seminary in New York.

Broadcasting

Batchelor and Alexander

John Batchelor co-hosted Batchelor and Alexander with writer Paul Alexander on WABC in New York for over two years. They focused on international issues with special attention to Middle East-based terrorism. Batchelor described their approach: "Our model is the BBC World Service, with music and live interviews, but without English accents." Alexander quipped: "We're not NPR, where they do setups to things on tape. Well, we could be NPR on drugs."

Three days before the September 11 attacks, they presented a four-hour WABC show on the USS Cole bombing, interviewing several guests.

Alexander left the show in December 2003 to pursue work as a playwright and biographer.

The John Batchelor Show
The John Batchelor Show began its national syndication in April 2003.  The program airs 20 hours a week on roughly 200 stations.  Its focus is geopolitics, economics, war, history, hard sciences, literature, private space, whimsy, etc.  Historically, it carried nightly (Mon-Fri) the "Loftus Report" featuring the intelligence commentator John Loftus on current, war-related, open-source intelligence. Aaron Klein, at the time Jerusalem bureau chief for WorldNetDaily, was also a regular and served as a co-host. Other regular contributors included Malcolm Hoenlein, the executive vice president of the Conference of Presidents of Major American Jewish Organizations; the New York attorney and taste-maker Ed Hayes; Larry Kudlow of CNBC's Kudlow & Company; Bill Whelan of the Hoover Institution; John Fund, Bret Stephens, Dan Henninger, Rob Pollock and Kim Strassel of the Wall Street Journal; Jim McTague of Barron's Magazine; Chuck Todd, then of The Hotline, now NBC Political Director; Fiona Harvey and Martin Wolf of the Financial Times; Jodi Schneider of the Congressional Quarterly; Matt Bai and A. O. Scott of the New York Times; Katrina vanden Heuvel and Stephen F. Cohen of The Nation; Victor Davis Hanson, Henry Miller, and Larry Diamond of the Hoover Institution; Adrian Wooldridge, Robert Guest, and John Parker of the Economist; Monica Crowley; David Grinspoon, resident expert on the planet Mars and outer space, and Robert Zimmerman, award-winning NASA observer.  The program daily featured reports from journalists who filed with the world's most respected press outlets, and the show was reliably a few days ahead of the news cycle.

When John Batchelor occasionally took a break for several evenings, the show was often hosted by Jed Babbin, editor of Human Events in Washington, D.C.; sometimes by the former BBC journalist John Terrett, who now works for Al Jazeera; and by Larry Kudlow of CNBC's Kudlow & Company and WABC's Larry Kudlow Show. In 2012, Simon Constable of Dow Jones; Chris Riback, author and researcher, and Francis Rose of Federal News Radio in Washington, D.C., became primary fill-ins.

Batchelor's show featured multiple guests, and shows were preceded by and interspersed with news clips and music. The show focused on myriad topics, including politics, the war on terror, nuclear proliferation, the UN, African civil wars, American history, space exploration and even Hollywood scandals. The Jerusalem Post has an audio archive of Batchelor and Alexander segments from 2002 and 2003 that deal with Israel and the Middle East.

To report on breaking news, Batchelor and his executive producer have travelled domestically to hotspots, and to Azerbaijan, Qatar, Israel, Jordan, Kazakhstan, Uzbekistan, France, Poland and Taiwan. They landed in Taipei to broadcast for the week leading up to the 2004 elections when, on the last day of electioneering, both the president and the vice-president were shot and wounded by an unknown assailant.

First cancellation and subsequent return
On Monday, August 25, 2006, Batchelor announced on air that his ABC show would be canceled, beginning with the show scheduled for the next Monday, September 1.

Batchelor returned on WABC as the host of a weekly version of the previous show on October 7, 2007, from 7–10pm Eastern Time. He then hosted a second show as a guest host on KFI in Los Angeles, filling the vacancy caused by the departure of Matt Drudge, in the next three hours from 7–10pm Pacific time. His first program featured an interview with Nick Grace of ClandestineRadio.com that broke the name of al Qaeda's extranet, Obelisk, and the news that the extranet's security tightened following a press leak in September 2007.

In 2009, Batchelor expanded his show to Saturday and Sunday nights, from 9pm to 1am, on most of his affiliates. The Saturday show focused more on authors of history books, while the Sunday show focused on breaking news and a wider range of topics.

On November 24, 2009, WABC announced that the Batchelor show would be also airing weeknights from 9pm to 1am, effective November 30.

Batchelor was a frequent guest on the Gene Countryman Show, KNSS, Wichita, Kansas, Sundays at 8pm Eastern. Batchelor on Tuesdays formerly featured an hour with Larry Kudlow on finance (until Kudlow became an advisor to President Trump), and then an hour with professor Stephen Cohen on Russia. Professor Cohen elected to take a break for a while and the Tuesday guest as of early 2020 is Gregory R. Copley, publisher of Defense and Foreign Affairs. On Wednesdays: an hour-plus with Gordon Chang on China and East Asia, and one or two segments on private exploration of space with Dr. David Livingston; on Thursdays: an hour with Mary Kissel on domestic U.S. politics, foreign policy, and matters Australian (until Kissel became a senior advisor to Secretary of State Mike Pompeo), then an hour and a half with Malcolm Hoenlein on the Middle East.

CBS Eye on the World
On March 5, 2021, Batchelor hosted his last episode of The John Batchelor Show on WABC and Westwood One, as WABC shuffled its format and the show ended its affiliation with Westwood One in favor of syndication by CBS News. Batchelor continued to produce show segments during March, styled as "The New John Batchelor Show". He noted during the segments that the show is "represented by CBS Audio Network." In April 2021, the show returned to stations across the country. The material is streamed on AudioBoom, linked from Batchelor's website; specific segments are announced on Twitter as they are available. In May 2021, Batchelor began identifying the show as CBS Eye on the World. On Monday, November 1, 2021, the program debuted on WOR in New York, airing from 9 PM to midnight, Monday through Friday.

Bibliography 
Writing as John Calvin Batchelor
The Further Adventures of Halley's Comet (1980) (novel) 
The Birth of the People's Republic of Antarctica, Dial Press (1983) (novel) 
American Falls (1985) (novel) 
Thunder in the Dust: Classic Images of Western Movies (1987) (with John R. Hamilton) 
Peter Nevsky and the True Story of the Russian Moon Landing (1993) (novel) 
Father's Day, (1994) (novel) 
"Ain't You Glad You Joined the Republicans?": A Short History of the GOP (May 1996) (nonfiction) 

Writing as Tommy "Tip" Paine
Gordon Liddy Is My Muse (1990) (novel) 
Walking the Cat (1991) (novel)

Frequent guests 

John Avlon, Daily Beast; progressive commentator, author of Wingnuts: How the Lunatic Fringe Is Hijacking America
Jeff Bliss, The Bliss Index
John R. Bolton, former United States Ambassador to the United Nations; American Enterprise Institute; National Security Advisor of the United States. 
Lara M. Brown, political historian and author
Gordon G. Chang, Daily Beast; noted anti-Communist Chinese commentator
Stephen F. Cohen, Russian studies scholar at Princeton University
Simon Constable, MarketWatch
Gregory R Copley, editor and publisher of Defense & Foreign Affairs
Christopher Nixon Cox, Liechtenstein Institute at Princeton University
Monica Crowley, Washington Times and Fox News
Judy Dempsey, Editor in chief StrategicEurope, blog of Carnegie_Europe. 
David Drucker, Washington Examiner senior Congressional correspondent
John Fund, NRO
Charlie Gasparino, appears less often than before
Taegan Goddard, Political Wire
Lou Ann Hammond, CEO of www.carlist.com; CEO of www.drivingthenation.com
Victor Davis Hanson, The Hoover Institution
Malcolm Hoenlein, Conference of Presidents of Major American Jewish Organizations
Larry Johnson, No Quarter blog
Mary Kissel, formerly of The Wall Street Journal
Larry Kudlow, formerly of CNBC and late Reagan administration; Director of the National Economic Council under President Donald Trump
Thaddeus McCotter, MI-11; R.
Marc Morano, Climate Depot
Devin Nunes, CA-21; R
Arif Rafiq, Pakistan Policy Blog
Bill Roggio, Long War Journal
John Tamny, RealClearPolitics
Vijay V. Vaitheeswaran, The Economist
Adrian Wooldridge, The Economist
Bob Zimmerman, author of Leaving Earth
Salena Zito, Pittsburgh Tribune-Review, New York Post

Regular segments include "Hotel California" (introduced by an instrumental version of the Eagles song), which was a discussion of California's former fiscal discombobulation and its political environment, including the gubernatorial and Senatorial races. Devin Nunes generally is included in the roundtable; also, Hotel Mars, episode n.

Robert Zimmerman of behindtheblack frequently comes on to talk about NASA and the space program, preceded by the music from the Star Trek end credits. The show's last segment (c.12:55 AM EST) invariably features Al Bowlly's "Midnight, the Stars and You", ending in a brief (<30sec) valediction/good-night, sometimes with a few moments with a guest (time for one question). The singer is sometimes mistaken for Al Jolson, as Batchelor introduces the singer simply with "here's Al," and the song dates from the time of Bowlly's late career. From 2001 to 2006, Batchelor ended his show with Kate Smith singing "God Bless America."

John Avlon, Jeff Bliss, Gordon Chang, Simon Constable, Taegan Goddard, Malcolm Hoenlein, Mary Kissel, Larry Kudlow, Francis Rose, and Chris Riback have frequently guest-hosted or co-hosted.

References

External links 
 The John Batchelor Show home page
 New York Sun op-eds archive
 Human Events op-eds archive
 

Radio personalities from New York City
Living people
1948 births
American people of Iranian-Assyrian descent
People from Bryn Mawr, Pennsylvania
Princeton University alumni
Union Theological Seminary (New York City) alumni
Westwood One
American science fiction writers
American male novelists